Johannes Tartarotti (born 2 August 1999) is an Austrian professional footballer who plays as a midfielder for SC Rheindorf Altach. He has represented Austria at under-21 level.

Club career

Early years
Tartarotti began his career with hometown club VfB Bezau. Between 2010 and 2011 he played briefly for nearby FC Langenegg. In 2013 he joined the regional academy of AKA Vorarlberg, where he progressed through all youth teams.

Rheindorf Altach
Ahead of the 2016–17 season, he moved to the reserve team of Rheindorf Altach. He made his debut in the Austrian Regionalliga in July 2016, when he was in the starting eleven on the second matchday of that season against Austria Salzburg.

In May 2017, Tartarotti was called up for the first team for the first time for the match against Red Bull Salzburg. He made his professional debut in July 2017, when he came on as a substitute for Patrick Salomon in the first round of the Austrian Cup against FC Dornbirn. In April 2018, he finally made his debut in the Austrian Football Bundesliga when he came off the bench for Stefan Nutz in the 86th minute of the 30th matchday of the 2017–18 season against Wolfsberger AC.

In July 2018, Tartarotti was sent on loan as part of a cooperation agreement to 2. Liga club SC Wiener Neustadt.

International career
On 17 November 2020, Tartarotti made his debut at under-21 level against Andorra, coming on as a late substitute for Hannes Wolf in a 4–0 win.

References

Living people
1999 births
Association football midfielders
Austrian footballers
SC Rheindorf Altach players
SC Wiener Neustadt players
Austrian Football Bundesliga players
Austrian people of Italian descent
People from Bregenz District
Footballers from Vorarlberg
Austria under-21 international footballers